A famous papyrus published at the end of the 19th century by Bernard Pyne Grenfell, the papyrus Revenue Laws is a comprehensive set of regulations on farm taxes in the reign of Ptolemy II Philadelphus (283–246), more precisely for the year –259/–258. This document contains tax regulations for the understanding of how Ptolemy II Philadelphus organized a sophisticated command economy.

Bibliography 
There exists two editions of this text:
 Bernard Pyne Grenfell, Revenue Laws of Ptolemy Philadelphus, Oxford, 1896. 
 Jean Bingen, Papyrus Revenue Laws, Göttingen, 1952. 

Studies:
 Jean Bingen, Le papyrus Revenue Laws, Westdt.Verlag, 1978.

Archaeological discoveries in Egypt
Revenue Laws
Hellenistic period